Heuchera abramsii is a rare species of flowering plant in the saxifrage family known by the common names San Gabriel alumroot and Abrams' alumroot.

It is endemic to the San Gabriel Mountains of southern California, where it grows on rocky slopes.

Heuchera abramsii is a rhizomatous perennial herb with small five-lobed leaves. It produces an inflorescence up to 15 centimeters tall which bears bright pink or magenta rounded, bell-like flowers.

The epithet abramsii commemorates LeRoy Abrams.

References

External links 
 Calflora Database: Heuchera abramsii (San Gabriel alumroot, Abrams's alumroot)
 Jepson Manual eFlora (TJM2) treatment of Heuchera abramsii
 UC Photos gallery — Heuchera abramsii

abramsii
Endemic flora of California
~
Natural history of the Transverse Ranges
Natural history of Los Angeles County, California
~
Flora without expected TNC conservation status